Events in 2021 in anime.

Releases

Films
A list of anime films that were released in theaters between January 1 and December 31, 2021.

Television series
A list of anime television series that debuted between January 1 and December 31, 2021.

Original net animations
A list of original net animations that debuted between January 1 and December 31, 2021.

Original video animations
A list of original video animations that debuted between January 1 and December 31, 2021.

Deaths

February
 February 8: Shūichirō Moriyama, Japanese voice actor (Porco Rosso, Adieu Galaxy Express 999, Ninja Scroll), dies at age 86.
 February 25: Masako Sugaya, Japanese voice actress (Aim for the Ace!, Nobody's Boy Remi, Perman, Urusei Yatsura), dies at age 83.
 February 27: Tasuku Saitō, Japanese animation producer (Gegege no Kitarō, Shōnen Ninja Kaze no Fujimaru, Tiger Mask), dies at age 87.

March
 March 15:
 Masahiro Anzai, Japanese voice actor (Sailor Moon, Urusei Yatsura), dies at age 66.
 Yasuo Otsuka, Japanese animator (The Great Adventure of Horus, Prince of the Sun, Future Boy Conan, Lupin the Third), dies at age 89.
 March 16: Minako Shiba, Japanese animator and character designer (Noir, Black Butler, Hikaru no Go), dies at age 50.

April
 April 16: Fumio Hisamatsu, Japanese manga artist and animator (Bōken Gabotenjima, Shōnen Ninja Kaze no Fujimaru, Super Jetter), dies at age 77.
 April 17: Osamu Kobayashi, Japanese animation director (Beck, End of the World, Paradise Kiss, Naruto: Shippuden), dies at age 57.
 April 24: Shunsuke Kikuchi, Japanese composer (Doraemon, Dragon Ball, Dr. Slump, Getter Robo, Tiger Mask), dies at age 89.

May 
 May 6: Kentaro Miura, Japanese manga artist (Berserk), dies at age 54.
 May 30: Haruka Nagashima, Japanese voice actress (Shiki, Sparrow's Hotel, Idol Incidents), dies at age 33.

July
July 1: Philece Sampler, American voice actress dies at age 67.

August 
 August 17: Masami Suda, Japanese animator and character designer (Fist of the North Star, Slam Dunk, Speed Racer), dies at age 77.

September 
 September 7: Eiichi Yamamoto, Japanese animation director and screenwriter (Kimba the White Lion, Cleopatra, Belladonna of Sadness), dies at age 80.
 September 24: Takao Saitō, Japanese manga artist (Golgo 13), dies at age 84.
 September 30: Koichi Sugiyama, Japanese music composer (Cyborg 009, Space Runaway Ideon, Dragon Quest: The Adventure of Dai), dies at age 90.

October 
 October 18: Christopher Ayres, American voice actor and ADR director (Dragon Ball Z Kai, Gantz, Dragon Ball Super), dies at age 56.
 October 21: Saori Sugimoto, Japanese voice actress (Shima Shima Tora no Shimajirō, Nintama Rantarō, Mobile Suit Gundam Wing), dies at age 58.
October 29: Yoshiko Ota, Japanese voice actress (Kimba the White Lion, Himitsu no Akko-chan, Princess Knight), dies at age 89.

November
 November 5: Kinji Yoshimoto, Japanese animation director (Arifureta: From Commonplace to World's Strongest, Queen's Blade, Genshiken), dies at age 55.

December
 December 1: Keiko Nobumoto, Japanese screenwriter (Cowboy Bebop, Wolf's Rain, Tokyo Godfathers), dies at age 57.
 December 3: Jōji Yanami, Japanese voice actor (Inuyasha, One Piece, Dragon Ball Z) and narrator (Dragon Ball), dies at age 90.
 December 8: Mitsutoshi Furuya, Japanese manga artist (Dame Oyaji), dies at age 85.
 December 18: Sayaka Kanda, Japanese voice actress (Sword Art Online, Real Girl, Idoly Pride), dies at age 35.

See also
2021 in Japanese television

Note

References

External links 
Japanese animated works of the year, listed in the IMDb

Years in anime
anime
anime